The Goldfield City Hall and Fire Station, at Victor Ave. and 9th St. in Goldfield, Colorado, was built in 1899.  It was listed on the National Register of Historic Places in 1984.

It is a two-story flat-roofed  building.

By 1983, it was the only remaining public structure of Goldfield.

References

City and town halls on the National Register of Historic Places in Colorado
Fire stations on the National Register of Historic Places in Colorado
National Register of Historic Places in Teller County, Colorado
Government buildings completed in 1899
1899 establishments in Colorado